Dmitry Pavlovich Tatischev or Tatistcheff (born 1767, died 16 September 1845 in Vienna) was a Russian diplomat and art collector, and an intimate friend of Ferdinand VII of Spain.

Of Rurikid stock, Tatishchev owed his elevation in no small degree to the influence of his aunt, Princess Dashkov. In 1799 he was appointed as a member of the Board of Foreign Affairs, and in 1810 he was appointed as a Senator of the State Council. In June 1802 Tatishchev was appointed an Envoy to the Court of the Kingdom of Naples until February 1803. He returned to Naples as Envoy in January 1805, staying in the city until 1808. In September 1815 he was appointed as Envoy Extraordinary and Minister Plenipotentiary to Spain, with concurrent accreditation to the Dutch royal court, holding these positions until January 1821. From 22 August 1826 to 11 September 1841 he was Ambassador Extraordinary and Plenipotentiary to Austria.

Tatishchev was a connoisseur of and collector of art, and held in his collection 200 paintings and 160 rare gems, which were bequeathed to Tsar Nicholas I. He brought from Spain several works attributed to Jan van Eyck, including the Crucifixion and Last Judgement diptych. Tatishchev's last days were spent in penury owing to his gambling addiction.

He had two sons Pavel and Vladimir from the extramarital affair with Natalya Koltovskaya (née Turchaninova), a daughter of Alexei Turchaninov.

References

1767 births
1845 deaths
Diplomats of the Russian Empire
Ambassadors of the Russian Empire to Austria
Ambassadors of Russia to Spain
Ambassadors of the Russian Empire to Italy
Ambassadors of the Russian Empire to the Netherlands
Ambassadors of the Russian Empire to the Ottoman Empire